Tourism in China is a growing industry that is becoming a significant part of the Chinese economy. The rate of tourism has expanded over the last few decades since the beginning of reform and opening-up. The emergence of a newly rich middle class and an easing of restrictions on movement by the Chinese authorities are both fueling this travel boom. China has become one of world's largest outbound tourist markets. According to Euromonitor International, economic growth and higher incomes in nearby Asian countries will help China to become the world's number one tourist destination by 2030.

China ranked second in the world for travel and tourism's contribution to GDP in 2022 ($814.1 billion), and first in the world for travel and tourism's contribution to employment (66,086,000 jobs in 2014). Tourism, based on direct, indirect, and induced impact, accounted for 9.3 percent of China's GDP in 2013. In 2017, the total contributions of China's Travel and Tourism sector made up 11% of its GDP. In 2018, the domestic tourism sector contributed around US$1.47 trillion to the nation's GDP.

Since 2012, tourists from China have been the world's top spender in international tourism, leading global outbound travel. In 2016, the country accounted for 21% of the world's international tourism spending, or $261 billion. (Note that the stats include journeys made to the special administrative regions of Hong Kong and Macau, as well as Taiwan; in 2017, these accounted for 69.5m of the so-called "overseas" journeys.) As of 2018, only 7% of Chinese had a passport, so the "potential for further growth is staggering", according to a UK news report.

History 

Between 1949 and 1974, the People's Republic was closed to all. In the late 1970s, when Deng Xiaoping decided to promote tourism vigorously as a means of earning foreign exchange, China started to develop its tourism industry. In 2018, the Chinese hotel industry had a large pipeline of 2,500 new hotel projects.

The expansion of domestic and international airline traffic and other tourist transportation facilities made travel more convenient. Over 250 cities and countries had been opened to foreign visitors by the mid-1980s. Travellers needed only valid visas or residence permits to visit 100 locations; the remaining locales required travel permits from public security departments. In 1985 approximately 1.4 million foreigners visited China, and nearly US$1.3 billion was earned from tourism.

In 2015, China was the fourth most visited country in the world, after France, United States, and Spain, with 56.9 million international tourists per year.
In 2017, tourism contributed about CNY 8.77 trillion (US$1.45 trillion), 11.04% of the GDP, and contributed direct and indirect employment of up to 28.25 million people. There were 139.48 million inbound trips and five billion domestic trips.

Inbound

China has become a major tourist destination following its reform and opening to the world in the late 1970s instigated by Deng Xiaoping. In 1978, China received about 230,000 international foreign tourists, mostly because of the severe limitations that the government placed on who was allowed to visit the country and who was not.

Data from 2016 showed that the majority of foreign visitors hailed from Asian countries with South Korea being the top source country for China inbound tourism. Among the number of tourist arrivals, a substantial 81.06 million are from Hong Kong, 23.5 million from Macau and 5.73 million coming from Taiwan. The number of foreigners visiting China in the same year, was 28.15 million.

In the same year, overnight visitors increased 4.2% over the same period of 2015 to 59.27 million (of which over 60% came from Hong Kong, Macau and Taiwan).

Visitor statistics
Most visitors arriving in China were from the following areas of residence or countries of nationality:

Language
Some form of Chinese is virtually universal in China, with Mandarin as the standard form and many other varieties also in use; some, like Cantonese and Shanghainese, have tens of millions of speakers.

According to research completed by The Daily Telegraph in 2017, less than 1 percent of people (some 10 million) in China speak English conversationally.

Tourist Attraction Rating Categories 

Tourist Attraction Rating Categories is a rating system used by the Chinese authorities to determine the quality of the attraction relative to its peers in terms of safety, sanitation and transportation. It is divided into five categories which are A (or 1A, the lowest level), AA (2A), AAA (3A), AAAA (4A) and AAAAA (5A, the highest level).

The categories are awarded based on, amongst other factors, the importance of the site, transportation, tours as well as issues related to safety and sanitation. The system was established in 1999 and extended in 2004 (when the category AAAAA was introduced). The ratings are administered by the China National Tourism Administration (CNTA) and are based on the code "Categories and Rating Standard of Tourist Attractions".

Cities

Notable ancient capitals

Xi'an, Shaanxi
Nanjing, Jiangsu
Luoyang, Henan
Xuchang, Henan
Hangzhou, Zhejiang
Zhengzhou, Henan
Anyang, Henan
Kaifeng, Henan

Renowned historic cities and old towns

Kuling town, Jiangxi
Chongqing
Guangzhou, Guangdong
Chengde, Hebei
Zhengding, Hebei
Jingziguan, Henan
Wuhan, Hubei
Fenghuang, Hunan
Huai'an, Jiangsu
Luzhi, Jiangsu
Suzhou, Jiangsu
Tongli, Jiangsu
Yangzhou, Jiangsu
Zhenjiang, Jiangsu
Zhouzhuang, Jiangsu
Shenyang, Liaoning
Hancheng, Shaanxi
Jinan, Shandong
Qufu, Shandong
Shanghai & Zhujiajiao
Pingyao, Shanxi
Chengdu, Sichuan
Huanglongxi, Sichuan
Lizhuang, Sichuan
Tianjin
Dali, Yunnan
Jianshui, Yunnan
Lijiang, Yunnan
Nanxun, Zhejiang
Wuzhen, Zhejiang
Xitang, Zhejiang

Famous sites

Mountain Lu, Jiujiang, Jiangxi, also called Mountain Lu National Park
Changbai Mountains, an important nature reserve home to the rare Siberian tiger
Grand Canal of China
Great Wall of China
Silk Road, abandoned cities along this famous ancient trading route
Huangshan, Anhui
Mount Jiuhua, Anhui
Mount Tianzhu, Anhui
Forbidden City, Beijing, once the center of the 'Chinese imperial universe' and off-limits to the masses - now open to all
Summer Palace, Beijing
Temple of Heaven, Beijing
Dazu Rock Carvings, Chongqing
Three Gorges, Chongqing and Hubei
Gulangyu Island, Fujian
Mogao Caves, Dunhuang, Gansu these 1,000-year-old man-made caves on the old Silk Road contain some of China's most impressive Buddhist heritage
Kuling town, Jiujiang, located on top of Mountain Lu, a former summer resort for European settlers in southern China
Li River, Guangxi, where boat trips are taken to see the contorted peaks that have been immortalized in Chinese scroll paintings
Caohai Lake, Guizhou, where many experience being punted along this shallow lake to see many of China's varied birdlife
Harbin International Ice and Snow Sculpture Festival, Harbin, Heilongjiang, where extravagant and bizarre sculptures can be seen from life-size ice castles with rainbow lighting to fantastical snowy tableaux
Yabuli Ski Resort, Heilongjiang, the country's largest ski resort where many Chinese take their skiing holiday
Longmen Grottoes, a parade of Buddhist figurines and reliefs, near Luoyang, Henan
Wudang Mountains, Hubei
Old Yalu Bridge, Dandong, Liaoning, a half-demolished bridge to North Korea remains an important relic of the Korean War.
Terracotta Army, Xi'an, Shaanxi, the former ancient capital, these 2,200-year-old life-size soldiers guard the tomb of China's first emperor.
Confucius Mansion, Qufu, Shandong, home to nearly eighty generations of the great sage's clan
Mount Tai (or Tai Shan), Shandong, a holy peak home to immaculate temples and pavilions
The Bund, Shanghai, an elegant parade along the Huangpu River of colonial architecture juxtaposed with Shanghai's skyscrapers
The Hanging Temple at Mount Heng, Shanxi is a temple clinging to a precipice and a series of grottoes containing a panoply of Buddhist statuary
Yungang Grottoes, near Datong, Shanxi, a renowned Buddhist site
Jiuzhaigou Valley, Sichuan
Leshan Giant Buddha, Sichuan, the world's largest carved Buddha
Mount Emei, Sichuan
Mount Qingcheng, Sichuan
Potala Palace, Lhasa, Tibet originally built by King Songtsän Gampo in 637 to greet his bride Princess Wencheng of the Tang dynasty
Xishuangbanna Dai Autonomous Prefecture, Yunnan, home to one of China's most unique minorities - the Dai people
West Lake, Hangzhou, Zhejiang

Tourist resources

Tourist resources in China can be divided into three main groups: natural sites, historical and cultural sites, and folk customs. China has 55 World Heritage Sites, the second largest in the world after Italy, which has 58.

Natural sites

China's mountains, lakes, valleys, caves and waterfalls include:

Mount Tai (Tai Shan) in the east, Mount Hengshan in the south, Mount Hua in the west, Mount Hengshan in the north, and Mount Song in the center of China have been called the Five Sacred Mountains since antiquity. The Taishan massif, which snakes through central Shandong, is admired by Chinese as paramount among them. Another mountain celebrated for its beauty is Huangshan in southern Anhui, known for its graceful pines, unusual rocks, cloud seas and hot springs.

Jiuzhaigou, Huangguoshu Waterfall, and Guilin are all located in southwestern China. Jiuzhaigou in northern Sichuan is a beautiful "fairyland valley" running over 40 km through snow-covered mountains, lakes, waterfalls, and forest. The Huangguoshu Waterfalls in Guizhou are a group of waterfalls, 18 above-ground and four below, which can be heard from five km away. The Li River in Guangxi Zhuang Autonomous Region winds its way through karst peaks for 82 km between Guilin and Yangshuo.

On the plateau in Northern China are many lakes. The Tianchi (Heavenly Pool) in the Tianshan Mountains in Xinjiang Autonomous Region is 1,980 meters above sea level. This 105-m-deep lake is crystal clear, the high mountains surrounding it carpeted with green grass and colorful flowers.

Along the renowned Three Gorges of the Yangtze River are many scenic spots and historical sites; the Qutang Gorge is rugged and majestic, the Wu Gorge elegant, deep and secluded, the Xiling Gorge full of shoals and reefs and rolling water. The Lesser Three Gorges are lush with greenery, flanking water so clear you can see to the bottom. The Three Gorges Dam built here is China's biggest key hydro-power project.

Historical and cultural sites 

China's long history has left many cultural relics and the title of "China Top Tourist City" has gone to the first group of 54 cities. The Great Wall, a symbol of the Chinese nation, is also a prime example of historical sites that have become major tourist attractions. As the greatest defense-structure project in the history of human civilization, it dates back more than 2,000 years ago to the Spring and Autumn and the Warring States periods - huge in its scale and grandeur. There are more than ten sections of the Great Wall open to tourists, including the passes, blockhouses and beacon towers at Badaling in Beijing, Laolongtou in Hebei and Jiayuguan Pass in Gansu.

Grottoes filled with precious murals and sculptures are concentrated along the ancient Silk Road in Gansu. The best known are the Mogao Caves, a "treasure house of oriental art", with 492 caves with murals and statues on the cliff faces. There are 45,000 sq m of murals and over 2,100 colorful statues, all of high artistry. In the south, grotto art is represented in Sichuan by the Leshan Giant Buddha, carved into a cliff face. Seventy-one meters high and 28 meters wide, it is the largest sitting Buddha in stone, showing the carving skill of ancient craftsmen.

The Shaolin Temple in Henan, the birthplace of Chinese Zen Buddhism and famous for its Shaolin Kung Fu martial arts, dates back to 495 AD. Here can be seen the Ming period Five-Hundred-Arhats Mural and Qing period Shaolin kungfu paintings. In western Sichuan, Mount Emei, dotted with ancient Buddhist temples and structures, is one of China's four sacred Buddhist mountains｡

South of the Yangtze River, Suzhou and Hangzhou, long known as "paradise on earth", are crisscrossed with rivers, lakes, bridges, fields and villages, as beautiful as paintings. Today's well-preserved ancient cities includes that of Pingyao in central Shanxi, but was also the site of the Neolithic era Yangshao and Longshan cultures, 5,000 to 6,000 years ago. Ancient Lijiang in Yunnan is not only the center of Dongba culture of the Nakhi ethnic group but also a meeting place for the cultures of Han, Tibetan and Bai ethnicities. Built in the Song dynasty, this city has many stone bridges, stone memorial arches and dwelling houses, which provide precious materials for architectural history and can be called a "living museum of ancient dwelling houses."

Folk customs

"March Street" celebrated by the Bai people in Dali, Yunnan, is associated with the Buddhist Goddess of Mercy suppressing a devil to help the Bai people. It became traditional to burn incense and offer sacrifices to commemorate her virtues every year and the festival has become a major annual gathering for Bai commercial, cultural and sports activities.

The Water-Sprinkling Festival of the Dai ethnic group in Xishuangbanna, Yunnan, is a lively occasion taking place in the spring. People chase and pour water (a symbol of good luck and happiness) over each other, among other activities such as dragon boat racing and peacock dance.

Lugu Lake between Sichuan and Yunnan has become a tourist destination following the building of a new highway giving access to this area. The matriarchal society of the 30,000 local Mosuo people is noted for its "no marriage" traditions and is called the last women's kingdom on the earth. Mosuo women, local dugout canoes and undulating singing style are considered unique to Lugu Lake.

Tourist themes
The China National Tourism Administration promotes a tourist theme every year; 1992 was "Friendly Sightseeing Year." Then came "Landscape Tour", "Tour of Cultural Relics and Historical Sites", "Folk Customs Tour", "Holiday Tour", and "Ecological Environment Tour." From 2000 to 2004, the themes were "Century Year", "Sports and Health of China", "Folk Arts of China", and "Culinary Kingdom of China", and "Catch the Lifestyle."

The themes for 2005 were "China Travel Year" and "Beijing 2008 -- Welcome to China." In order to strengthen exchange and cooperation with the international tourism industry, the China National Travel Administration is planning a series of related events, including the Shanghai-hosted "2005 International Tourism Fair of China", the Beijing-hosted 2005 annual meeting of the Federation of Travel Agencies of France, and "the 2005 China-Australia Tourism Symposium."

Since 2013, all regions in China have had tourism publicity events under the "Beautiful China" umbrella, but with a different theme for each area. The year 2018 was declared as "Beautiful China – Year of Integrated Tourism" while 2017 was declared as "Beautiful China – Year of Silk Road Tourism".

Tourist services

The fast development of China's transportation infrastructure provides wide-ranging travel for domestic and overseas tourists. Throughout China many hotels and restaurants have been constructed, renovated or expanded to satisfy all levels of requirement, including many with five or six-star ratings.

China has regulated international travel agencies. On June 12, 2003, the China National Tourism Administration and the Ministry of Commerce jointly issued Interim Regulations on the Establishment of Foreign-funded or Wholly Foreign-owned Travel Agencies.

See also
Golden Week (China)
Red tourism
Tourism in Taiwan
Visa policy of China

Notes and references

External links

Ministry of Culture and Tourism of the People's Republic of China